Koy Dennis Detmer (born July 5, 1973) is a former American football quarterback. He was drafted by the Philadelphia Eagles in the seventh round of the 1997 NFL Draft.  He played college football at Colorado. He is the younger brother of former NFL quarterback Ty Detmer.

Early years
Detmer played at Mission High School, in Mission, Texas.  He led the Eagles to the 5A playoffs in 1990 and 1991.  The 1990 team lost in the semifinals against eventual state champion Aldine Mustangs (54-21).  With Detmer at quarterback, Mission High established a state record with 4,829 passing yards for a season in 1990.

College career
At Colorado, Detmer threw for 5,390 yards. He also set a school record in passing for 40 touchdowns.

Statistics

Professional career
Drafted in the 7th round of the 1997 NFL draft, Detmer spent the next 10 years in Philadelphia. He spent most of his career as a backup to quarterback Donovan McNabb and as the place-kick holder for David Akers. His action as a starter was limited to five games in the 1998 season and one game in the 2002 season, in which McNabb was out with a broken ankle. Detmer played well in that game, going 18 of 26 for 227 yards and three total touchdowns (two passing and one rushing). He dislocated his elbow in the fourth quarter of that game and was replaced by third-string quarterback A. J. Feeley. Detmer healed enough to play in the final games of 2002, but head coach Andy Reid decided to stay with Feeley, who was having success. He also saw sporadic playing time in the 2004 and 2005 seasons.

Prior to the 2006 season, Detmer was released after the Eagles brought back A. J. Feeley and signed former Pro Bowl quarterback Jeff Garcia as the backups. He was re-signed on January 2, 2007 by the Eagles to provide a third quarterback for the team's playoff push, with Donovan McNabb out with injury. He was also re-signed to be the kick holder for the Eagles.

Detmer had his NFL career extended for a few days by signing with the Minnesota Vikings on November 6, 2007. The Vikings needed a second quarterback behind Brooks Bollinger while Tarvaris Jackson and Kelly Holcomb recovered from injuries. Detmer was reunited with Vikings head coach Brad Childress, who had been with the Eagles as the offensive coordinator. Detmer's stint with the Vikings was his first professional experience not in an Eagle uniform. The Vikings released Detmer on November 10, 2007, once Holcomb had recovered sufficiently to play.

In 103 NFL games, Detmer has a career passer rating of 61.2 with ten career touchdowns and 14 interceptions thrown. Despite poor passing numbers, Detmer managed to have an 11-year career due to his ability to hold for place-kicks; then-Eagles special teams coach John Harbaugh and Pro Bowl kicker David Akers both spoke highly of Detmer's talent and skill in this area.

NFL career statistics

Personal life
Detmer is a coach on the Somerset High School (Somerset, Texas) staff under his father, head coach Hubert "Sonny" Detmer. He also coached his son, Koy Detmer Jr., at Somerset. His son committed to Ty's alma mater, Brigham Young University, as a walk-on quarterback for the 2015 season. 
Mission CISD named Koy Detmer the Mission High School football coach at a board meeting on February 1, 2016. He is married to Monica Miller Detmer, who is a teacher and high school girls' basketball coach in Mission.

In popular culture
The speculative fiction work 17776 mentions a scavenger hunt played in the far future in which players try to find every football autographed by Detmer. It assumes that Detmer signed a total of 43 footballs throughout his career, poking fun that it would be far fewer than his brother, Ty.

References

External links

 Koy Detmer at NFL.com
 
 Philadelphia Eagles bio (archived from 2007)
 What football will look like in the future - fiction story involving footballs signed by Detmer

1973 births
Living people
American football quarterbacks
Players of American football from San Antonio
Colorado Buffaloes football players
Philadelphia Eagles players
People from Mission, Texas